Chris Isham may refer to:

 Christopher Isham (born 1944), theoretical physicist
 Chris Isham (journalist), American journalist